Pierre Johnsson (born February 7, 1984) is a Swedish former professional ice hockey defenceman, who last played for Frölunda HC of the Elitserien. He was selected by the Calgary Flames in the 7th round (207th overall) of the 2002 NHL Entry Draft.

Johnsson played the 2010–11 season with Luleå HF of the Elitserien. In November 2013, Johnsson officially announced his retirement.

Career statistics

Regular season and playoffs

International

References

Johnsson retires (Swedish)

External links

1984 births
Calgary Flames draft picks
Frölunda HC players
Living people
Luleå HF players
Swedish ice hockey defencemen
Sportspeople from Karlstad